Aporreadillo or aporreado is a typical dish from southwestern Mexican cuisine.

This dish consists of meat beaten with a stone, salted, shredded, stirred with egg and cooked in guajillo chili, árbol chili or serrano chili sauce, with garlic and cilantro. It can be made of beef or venison meat, dried and salted, or cecina. It is accompanied with rice and beans for breakfast or dinner. The aporreadillo can be red or green, depending on the color of the sauce. It is traditional in the states of Guerrero and Michoacán.

References

 Gironella, A. Larousse de la cocina mexicana 
Cocineras guerrerenses piden rescate de cocina tradicional (Spanish)

Mexican cuisine
Beef dishes